Leonard Murray may refer to:

Hubert Leonard Murray, Australian colonial governor
Leonard Murray (railroad executive), American railroad executive
Leonard W. Murray, Canadian naval officer

See also
Mount Leonard Murray, Papua New Guinea
Len Murray, British trade union leader